Tilt is a Polish rock band who have been playing together on and off since 1979. They are regarded as one of the first punk bands in the nation, but as the founder mentioned in an interview, they were a post punk band from the beginning. Tilt was founded in Warsaw in 1979 by Tomasz Lipinski and it has continued to exist to the present day, with several breaks in between. In its first years, Tilt performed songs in English, later switching to Polish.  Currently, they perform and record as Tomek Lipinski & Tilt, with Lipinski on guitar and vocals, Wojciech Konikiewicz on keyboards, Karol Ludew on drums, Piotr Leniewicz on bass, and Alek Korecki on saxophone.

Name
The name comes from the penalty message "Tilt" in pinball machines, which is displayed after excessive "nudging", and in Polish gamers' parlance "to nudge" was actually "tiltować", "to tilt". As Lipinski explained, "We wanted to act on society in this way: to 'tilt' it."

Selection of past and present members
Several members of the Polish punk scene have rotated through the band's ranks:

 Tomek Lipiński – vocals, guitar
 Tomasz Szczeciński – bass
 Jacek Lenartowicz – drums
 Tomasz "Gogo Szulc" Kożuchowski – drums
  – saxophone
 Franz Dreadhunter – bass, keyboards
 Tomasz Pierzchalski – saxophone
 Artur Hajdasz – drums
 Dariusz Malejonek – bass
 Marcin Ciempiel – bass
 Tomasz Czulak – drums
 Piotr Lewicki – keyboards, guitar

Discography

Albums
 Tilt (1988)
 Czad Kommando Tilt (1990)
 Rzeka miłości, koncert w Buffo '96 (1996 - live album)
 Emocjonalny terror (2002)
 Gwiazdy polskiej muzyki lat 80. (2007 - compilation album)
 TILT i Tomek Lipiński - przebojowa kolekcja DZIENNIKA (2007)

Singles
 "Runął już ostatni mur" (1985)
 "Za zamkniętymi drzwiami (Widziałem cię)"(1985 - featured on the compilation Fala)
 "Mówię ci, że..." (1986)
 "Co się stało w tym kraju nad Wisłą?" (2002)

References

External links
 

Polish punk rock groups